Haymar, also spelled Heymer, is a village in northern Aleppo Governorate, northern Syria.

With 1,749 inhabitants, as per the 2004 census, Haymar administratively belongs to Nahiya Jarabulus within Jarabulus District. Nearby localities include al-Haluwaniyah  to the northwest, Tall Shair  to the northeast, and Yusuf Bayk  to the south.

References

Villages in Aleppo Governorate
Populated places in Jarabulus District